An urban guerrilla  is someone who fights a government using unconventional warfare or domestic terrorism in an urban environment.

Theory and history 
The urban guerrilla phenomenon is essentially one of industrialised society, resting both on the presence of large urban agglomerations where hideouts are easy to find and on a theory of alienation proper to the modern society of mass consumption.

Michael Collins, a commander of the Irish Republican Army (IRA) is often considered to be the father of modern urban guerrilla warfare.  In April 1919 an elite assassination unit, known as The Squad or Twelve Apostles, was created in Dublin.  The unit was tasked with hunting down and executing British Intelligence operatives in the city; they can be considered one of the first true urban guerrilla units.

Historically guerrilla warfare was a rural phenomenon, it was not until the 1960s that the limitations of this form were clearly demonstrated. The technique was almost entirely ineffective when used outside of the later colonial environment, as was shown by the Cuban-sponsored efforts in Latin America during the 1960s culminating in the foco campaign headed by Che Guevara in Bolivia that culminated in his death. The need for the target government to be simultaneously incompetent, iniquitous, and politically isolated was rarely met.

The failure of rural insurgency forced the discontented to find new avenues for action, essentially random terrorism aimed at creating maximum publicity, provoking the targeted regimes into excessive repression and so inciting the general population to join a wider revolutionary struggle. This movement found its mentor in the leader of the ephemeral Ação Libertadora Nacional, Carlos Marighela. Before his death in 1969 he wrote the Minimanual of the Urban Guerrilla which, between the polemics, gave clear advice on strategy and was quickly adopted by others around the world.

Historical examples 

However, not all urban political violence can be labeled as urban guerrilla.  The Black Panther Party might not qualify, due to its public nature, although its policy of "self-defense" was interchangeable with a policy of armed struggle in highly policed African-American communities.  Similarly the Italian Autonomia movement and the German Autonomen engaged in urban political violence, but not as urban guerrillas due to their policies of public, mass and non-deadly violence.

In the 1970s BBC comedy "Citizen Smith" Wolfie Smith, the leader of the fictional "Tooting Popular Front" described himself as an Urban Guerrilla.

Africa

 Algeria's National LIberation Front (FLN)

Ethiopia
 Ethiopian People's Revolutionary Party

Somalia
 Hizbul Islam
 Al-Shabaab
 Raskamboni Movement

Asia

Bangladesh
 Crack Platoon during the 1971 Pakistan-Bangladesh War

India
 Naxalite movement
 insurgency in Jammu and Kashmir
 Insurgency in Northeast India

South Korea
 SKNLF
 SKSWA

Iran
 Organization of Iranian People's Fedai Guerrillas (OIPFG) (formed 1970)
 People's Mujahedin of Iran (formed 1970)

Iraq
 Numerous insurgent forces

Japan
Leftists:
 Japan Revolutionary Communist League, National Committee (Middle Core Faction)
 Japan Revolutionary Communist League (Revolutionary Marxist Faction)
 Fourth International Japan
 Red Army Faction
 Japanese Red Army (detached from Red Army Faction and Kyoto Partisan in 1971)
 United Red Army (Remnants of Red Army Faction and the Maoist Revolutionary Left Wing of the Japanese Communist Party merged in 1971)
 East Asia Anti-Japan Armed Front

Fascists:
 Tatenokai

Malaysia
 Malayan Communist Party (PKM)

Lebanon
 Hezbollah

Palestinian Territories
 Hamas
Popular Front for the Liberation of Palestine
PLO
Lehi

Philippines
 Alex Boncayao Brigade (ABB)

Turkey
 Revolutionary People's Liberation Party–Front (DHKP-C)
 Marxist–Leninist Communist Party (Turkey) (MLKP)
 Devrimci Yol (DEV-YOL)
 Turkish Revolutionary Youth Federation
 Devrimci Karargâh (DK)
 Group of Communities in Kurdistan (KCK)
 Kurdistan Workers Party (PKK)

Europe

Belgium
 Cellules Communistes Combattantes (CCC)
 Front Revolutionaire d' Action Prolétarienne (FRAP)

France
 Action Directe - A far-left group.
  - A fascist group.
 FLNC - A Corsican separatist group.
 Organisation armée secrète - A far-right group.

Germany
Leftists:
 Movement 2 June
 Red Army Faction (RAF)
 Revolutionary Cells (RZ)

Fascists:
 Nationalsozialistischer Untergrund (NSU)

Greece
 Revolutionary Organization 17 November
 Revolutionary Struggle
 Revolutionary Nuclei
 Sect of Revolutionaries
 Conspiracy of Fire Nuclei

Iceland
 Kópamaros
 X18 (guerilla movement)

Ireland

 Irish Republican Army
 Irish National Liberation Army 
 Provisional Irish Republican Army

Italy

Poland
Combat Organization of the Polish Socialist Party
Rewolucyjni Mściciele

Spain

 ETA
 ETA-pm
 Terra Lliure
 MPAIAC, Canary Islands Independence Movement
 GRAPO
 Resistência Galega
 Iraultza
 Comandos Autónomos Anticapitalistas
 FRAP
 Arxiu
 Exèrcit Popular Català
 Escamots Autònoms d´Alliberament
 Hermanos Quero 
 Front d'Alliberament de Catalunya
 Organització de la Lluita Armada
 Exército Guerrilheiro do Povo Galego Ceive
 Liga Armada Galega
 Loita Armada Revolucionaria
 Fuerzas Armadas Guanches
 Andecha Obrera

United Kingdom
 Scottish National Liberation Army
 MAC
 An Gof
 Free Wales Army
 Cornish National Liberation Army

North America

Canada
 FLQ (Quebec)
 Squamish Five
 Wimmin's Fire Brigade

Cuba
 26th of July Movement (M-26-7)

El Salvador
 FMLN

Nicaragua
 FSLN

United States

 American Indian Movement
 Black Guerilla Family
 Black Liberation Army
 Black Panther Party
 Border Ruffian
 Brown Berets
 Bushwacker
 Chicano Liberation Front
 Earth Liberation Front
 George Jackson Brigade
 Green Mountain Anarchist Collective
 Jayhawker
 Ku Klux Klan
 May 19th Communist Movement
 MOVE
 New Black Panther Party
 The Night Riders
 Quantrill's Raiders
 Red Shirts (United States)
 Republic of Texas (group)
 Sovereign citizen movement 
 Symbionese Liberation Army
 US Organization
 Weather Underground Organization

South America

Argentina
 Montoneros - A leftist group.
 Ejército Revolucionario del Pueblo (ERP) - A leftist group.
 Tacuara Nationalist Movement (MNT) - A fascist group.

Brazil
 National Liberation Action (ALN)
 Popular Liberation Movement (Molipo)
 Revolutionary Movement 8th October (MR-8)
 Armed Revolutionary Vanguard Palmares (VAR-Palmares)
 Popular Revolutionary Vanguard (VPR)

Chile
Leftists:
 Lautaro Youth Movement (MJL)
 Manuel Rodríguez Patriotic Front (FPMR)
 Movimiento de Izquierda Revolucionaria (MIR)

Fascists:
 Fatherland and Liberty (PyL)

Colombia
 19th of April Movement (M-19)
 Revolutionary Armed Forces of Colombia
 National Liberation Army

Uruguay
 Tupamaros

Venezuela
 Fuerzas Armadas de Liberacion Nacional
 Bandera Roja

See also 
 Guerrilla warfare and unconventional warfare
 Insurgency and Counterinsurgency
 Terrorism, Counter-terrorism and anti-terrorist legislation
 Propaganda of the deed
 Strategy of tension
 State of exception
 False flag attacks
 Molotov cocktail

References

External links
Suggested readings:

Greene, T.N. (ed) The Guerrilla—and How to Fight Him: Selections From the Marine Corps Gazette. Frederick A. Praeger, 1964.
Molnar et al., Undergrounds in Insurgent, Revolutionary, and Resistance Warfare. Special Operations Research Office, American University, 1963.
Oppenheimer, Martin. The Urban Guerrilla. Quadrangle, 1969.
 The Black Bloc Papers: An Anthology of Primary Texts From The North American Anarchist Black Bloc 1988-2005, by Xavier Massot & David Van Deusen of the Green Mountain Anarchist Collective (NEFAC-VT), Breaking Glass Press, 2010.
 A Communiqué on Tactics and Organization to the Black Bloc, from within the Black Bloc, by The Green Mountain Anarchist Collective (NEFAC-VT) & Columbus Anti-Racist Action, Black Clover Press, 2001.
 Van Deusen On North American Black Blocs 1996-2001, by David Van Deusen, The Anarchist Library, 2017. 
 Peter Polack, Guerrilla Warfare; Kings of Revolution,Casemate,.

 
Terrorism tactics
Guerrilla warfare by type
Revolutions